Claude Charles Marie du Campe de Rosamel (24 June 1774 – 27 March 1848) was a French politician and naval officer.

Rosales was born at the Château de Rosamel in Frencq, Northern France on June 24, 1774.

He was commander of the Pomone in the action of 29 November 1811 against the British.  
{{cquote|The damaged state of the Pomone  at her surrender clearly proved, that her colours had not come down until all further resistance was vain.  Her main and mizen masts fell, as we have stated, during the action, and her foremast very soon shared their fate. The hull of the Pomone was so shattered by the Active'''s quick and well-directed fire, that the ship had five feet water in the hold; and her loss, out of a crew of 332 men and boys, amounted, as acknowledged by her officers, to 50 in killed and wounded."}} 
Rosamel was wounded in action.1811 – Alceste and Active with Pauline and consorts

He served as French naval minister from September 6, 1836 until March 31, 1839. During his administration, several national scientific voyages were launched, most notably that of the Astrolabe'' to the Magellan Straits and Antarctica. It was during this voyage that an island was named in his honor. It was subsequently renamed Andersson Island.

Rosamel sent French troops to Cuba to guard its assets in the Cuba and Mexico in March 1837, precipitating more problems between the governments. France had failed to recognize Mexico's independence. Mexico ultimately declared war against France, in which a naval blockade played a key role.

He was said to have left the Ministry poorer than he entered. He died in Paris on March 27, 1848, leaving his children without an inheritance.

References

1774 births
1848 deaths
People from Pas-de-Calais
Politicians from Hauts-de-France
Members of the 3rd Chamber of Deputies of the July Monarchy
Members of the 4th Chamber of Deputies of the July Monarchy
Members of the 5th Chamber of Deputies of the July Monarchy
Members of the Chamber of Peers of the July Monarchy
Names inscribed under the Arc de Triomphe